Gley may refer to:

 Eugène Gley (1857–1930), French physiologist and endocrinologist
 Gleysol, a type of hydric soil

See also
 Glay (disambiguation)